Gerhard Pankotsch (born 31 January 1949) is a retired German football midfielder.

References

1949 births
Living people
German footballers
Stuttgarter Kickers players
Association football midfielders
2. Bundesliga players

SpVgg Greuther Fürth managers